Major General Wang Puchen (July 12, 1901 - 2005) was born in Jiangshan of Qing Dynasty China's Zhejiang province. He was the Director of the Bureau of Investigation and Statistics for northern China stationed in Beijing. He reported directly to National Intelligence Director Dai Li.

Timeline

 1911 – Graduated from Jiangshan County Model Primary School
 1913 – Graduated from Jiangshan County Wenxi (文溪) High School
 1920 – Graduated from Ninth Provincial Normal College in Zhejiang province
 1921-1934 – Served as Education Bureau Chief (教育局局长) of Jiangshan County (江山县), Qingyuan County (庆元县), Wuyi County (武义县)
 1935 – Started work at Jiangsu Provincial Public Education Center. Also joined the Investigation and Statistics Bureau branch of the Military Commission and was appointed as director of the Central Party School of the Kuomintang.
 December 1936 – In his position as Major General responsible for the Bureau's Northwest Commandant, he secretly saved Chiang Kai-shek
 1937 – Appointed General Secretary of Jiangsu and Zhejiang Action Committee Special Command Post
 1938 – Appointed Major General Military Advisor of the Republic of China Army 41st military command, commander of the 11th military theater
 1939-1941 – General Secretary of the Office of Director Dai Li
 1941-January 1942 – Attended Central Military Academy (黄埔军校) sixth class
 After 1941 – deputy commander of Sichuan-Kham (康巴) theater. Publicly served as President Chiang Kai-shek's Investigation Section Chief stationed in Chengdu
 1944 – head of the Chief of Inspection Department of Xi'an Garrison Command, Major General of the Eighth Theater Survey Office
 1945 – Chief Inspector and Procuratorial Group leader of Investigation and Statistics Bureau for Beijing and Tianjin
 March 1946 – Working bureau's Nanjing region
 July 1948 - January 1949 – Director of the Bureau of Investigation and Statistics in Beijing (北平站站长). Served as coordinator for cease fire between Kuomintang and Communist Party of China.
 January 23, 1949 – Traveled to Nanjing from Beijing. Traveled to Taiwan in same year.
 September 1997 – Returned to mainland China to visit relatives
 July 2005 – Passed away in Taipei

Books

Wang Puchen authored several books including:

 "滚滚浪沙九十秋" - Turbulent Waves With Sands for 90 Autumns (1991)
 "一代奇人戴笠將軍" - Legendary General Dai Li (June 12, 2003)
 "三莅美境，六度月园" - Three Visits to US Seeing Six Full Moons

References

1901 births
2005 deaths
Taiwanese people from Zhejiang
People from Jiangshan
Politicians from Quzhou
Republic of China politicians from Zhejiang
Members of the Kuomintang
Spymasters